Spergo sibogae is a species of sea snail, a marine gastropod mollusk in the family Raphitomidae.

Description
The length of the shell attains 54 mm, its diameter 18 mm.

(Original description) The rather strong, fusiform shell is yellowish-brown. The protoconch is wanting. The 9 remaining whorls are moderately convex, slightly excavated below the conspicuous but shallow suture. The sculpture consists of remote, oblique, axial ribs, conspicuous in the upper whorls, fainter lower on, disappearing on the back of the body whorl. They form tubercles below the excavation, which in the upper whorls bear short plicae, just below the suture. The lower part of the whorls is crossed by very numerous spiral striae, conspicuous in upper whorls, faint on the last one, but stronger towards and on the siphonal canal. The aperture is elongately-oval, angular above, with a wide siphonal canal below. The peristome is damaged according to the fine growth-lines, with a very shallow sinus above, then regularly arched. The columellar margin is concave above, then nearly straight, at last slightly directed to the left, covered with a layer of enamel, which is thin above, stronger below. The interior of the aperture is smooth.

Distribution
This marine species occurs in the Banda Sea, Indonesia.

References

 Sysoev, A.; Bouchet, P. (2001). Gastéropodes turriformes (Gastropoda: Conoidea) nouveaux ou peu connus du Sud-Ouest Pacifique = New and uncommon turriform gastropods (Gastropoda: Conoidea) from the South-West Pacific. in: Bouchet, P. et al. (Ed.) Tropical deep-sea benthos. Mémoires du Muséum national d'Histoire naturelle. Série A, Zoologie. 185: 271-320.

External links
 
 Criscione, F.; Hallan, A.; Fedosov, A.; Puillandre, N. (2021). Deep Downunder: Integrative taxonomy of Austrobela, Spergo, Theta and Austrotheta (Gastropoda: Conoidea: Raphitomidae) from the deep sea of Australia. Journal of Zoological Systematics and Evolutionary Research. DOI 10.1111/jzs.12512

sibogae
Gastropods described in 1913